Cudmore may refer to:

People
 Alexander Cudmore (1888–1944), American soccer player
 Arthur Cudmore (1870–1951), Australian surgeon and professor
 Collier Cudmore (1885–1971), Australian lawyer, politician and Olympic rower
 Daniel Cudmore (born 1981), Canadian actor
 Daniel Cudmore (businessman) (1811–1891), early settler in South Australia
 Harold Cudmore (born 1944), Irish sailor
 Jamie Cudmore (born 1978), Canadian former rugby union player
 Richard Cudmore (1787–1840), English violinist

Other uses
 Cudmore National Park, Queensland, Australia
 Cudmore Creek, Ontario, Canada